The Cottle County Courthouse Historic District is a  historic district in Paducah, Texas which is roughly bounded by N. 7th, N. 10th, Garrett and Easly Streets. It was listed on the National Register of Historic Places in 2004. The listing included 40 contributing buildings and seven contributing structures. The eponymous courthouse, the district's central landmark, is a State Antiquities Landmark (SAL) and a Recorded Texas Historic Landmark (RTHL).

It is commanded by the four-story Art Deco Cottle County Courthouse (SAL #8200003008, 2005; RTHL #13447, 2005), designed by Wichita Falls architects Voelcker and Dixon during 1929-30.

It also includes construction by H.W. Underhill.  It includes at least one hotel.  It includes Mission/Spanish Revival architecture and Early Commercial architecture.

The site also includes 13 non-contributing buildings, a non-contributing site, two non-contributing structures, and four non-contributing objects.

See also

National Register of Historic Places listings in Cottle County, Texas
Recorded Texas Historic Landmarks in Cottle County
List of county courthouses in Texas

References

External links

Historic districts on the National Register of Historic Places in Texas
National Register of Historic Places in Cottle County, Texas
Mission Revival architecture in Texas
Early Commercial architecture in the United States
Government buildings completed in 1930